Carl E. Stotz (February 20, 1910 – June 4, 1992) was the American founder of Little League Baseball. Stotz was born in Williamsport, Pennsylvania.

He was the fourth of five children of Lulu Fisk Stotz the third child of a German immigrant (1862) named Kristjian and married first generation German-American Juliana Eddinger, in 1877 in Williamsport.

He is honored and memorialized in Williamsport at the following places: Carl E. Stotz Memorial Little League Bridge which carries U.S. Route 15 across the West Branch Susquehanna River between Williamsport and South Williamsport;  "Original League's" Field (a 1995 PA historical Site and 2014 National Historical Site) on West 4th Street in Williamsport, PA; Carl's neighborhood park - Gardenview Carl E. Stotz Park; a statue donated by the Mason's organization placed at Volunteer Stadium of L.L.B. Inc. in South Williamsport, PA; and a 3 player statue on Memorial Ave. & Park Point. 

In the summer of 1938, at a location next to West 4th Street (at that time Carl could not get permission from the City of Williamsport to start league play at this location), Stotz started to discuss his dream with local children from the neighborhood. He was always set on adult supervision to stop bickering on the sandlot. In 1939, he officially started up the league. The bases were placed 60 ft apart and the pitcher's mound was placed 40 ft from home plate. The initial 1939 games were played at Park Point.

A field at Memorial and Demarest Street in Williamsport housed the 1940 and 1941 seasons. In 1942, "Original League" returned to the August 1938 area where Carl Stotz, his nephews (Major and Jimmy Gehron) and other boys experimented to determine the league's dimensions and rules. The nephews mother, Laura Belle Stotz Gehron, sewed the initial bases. Carl hand-carved with a penknife the first home plate and pitchers mound.

The next step was for him to apply to local businesses for sponsorship and donations. He also looked to parents for help with the organization of the league. A year later in the summer of 1939 they had three teams set up. Each team was managed individually by Stotz (Lycoming Dairy) and brothers George (Lundy Lumber) and Bert Bebble (Jumbo Pretzel). The first game was played on June 6, 1939, with Lundy Lumber defeating Lycoming Dairy 23–8. The first Little League World Series wasn't played until the summer of 1948 though.

"Original League" on West Fourth Street is currently an unfranchised (from L.L.B. Inc.) and active league which hosted the first Little League Tournament (National Tournament) in 1947.  The "Original League" Field was the venue for the 1948 through 1958 series' games. Its clubhouse contains numerous articles of historical interest worthy of viewing, and holds an Open House every day during the Little League World Series in August. The Little League Women's Auxiliary (1947) was organized by Grayce Stotz, Carl's wife and a great "Original League" supporter.

Stotz was commissioner of Little League until 1955. Carl Stotz, a highly principled man, left Little League Baseball Inc. in late November 1955 over honest and valid philosophical differences centered on commercialization and central control issues with the management of L.L.B. Inc., of which Carl's conscience, would not permit him to remain.

From that point on Carl continued an active relationship with "Original League" until his passing in 1992.

External links 
 History of Little League
 
  

People from Williamsport, Pennsylvania
Little League
1910 births
1992 deaths